Leonard Eugene Krog is a Canadian politician and lawyer in British Columbia, who currently serves as Mayor of Nanaimo. Prior to his tenure as mayor, Krog served in the provincial legislature, and was first elected in the 1991 general election representing the riding of Parksville-Qualicum. In his first term, he served as a backbencher in the Mike Harcourt NDP government.  He ran for re-election in 1996 but was defeated by Paul Reitsma. He ran again in the 2005 election in the Nanaimo constituency and defeated the Liberal incumbent Mike Hunter.

In 2003, he ran for the leadership of the NDP but lost to Carole James.

When the NDP formed government in 2017, Krog was appointed Government Caucus Chair in the legislature.

On October 20, 2018, he was elected Mayor of Nanaimo.

Electoral record

References

External links
Official Biography from the website of the Legislative Assembly of British Columbia
BC NDP Web Profile
Authorized constituency web site

Year of birth missing (living people)
Living people
British Columbia New Democratic Party MLAs
Lawyers in British Columbia
Mayors of Nanaimo
21st-century Canadian politicians